Gallus may refer to:

People
Saint Gall or Gallus (c. 550 – c. 646), Irish monk
Gallus Anonymus, 12th-century Polish historian
Gallus, Bishop of Transylvania, 13th-century Hungarian prelate
Gallus Mag, 19th-century female bouncer at a New York bar
Georg Gallus (1927–2021), German politician
Chris Gallus (born 1943), Australian politician
Thomas Gallus (c. 1200–1246), French theologian 
Jacobus Gallus (1550–1591), Slovene composer
Nicolaus Gallus (c. 1516–1570), German Lutheran Reformer
Sandor Gallus (1907–1996), Australian archaeologist

Romans
Constantius Gallus (326–354), junior Roman emperor from 351 to 354
Cornelius Gallus (c. 70–26 BC), Roman poet, orator and politician
Quintus Roscius Gallus (c. 126–62 BC), Roman actor
Trebonianus Gallus (206–253), Roman emperor

Animal-related

Gallus (genus), a bird genus in the pheasant family
Gallus Lacepède, 1802, a synonym for the fish genus Alectis
Gallus (constellation), the cockerel, an obsolete constellation

Other
Gallus, the singular form of Galli, the eunuch priests of the Phrygian goddess Cybele
Gallus (album), 1992 album by Scottish rock band Gun
Gallus (Frankfurt am Main), a district of Frankfurt, Germany
Gallus (professional wrestling), a Scottish professional wrestling stable

See also

 
 Galli (disambiguation)

Latin-language surnames